Temple Shalom is a Reform Jewish synagogue in Wheeling, West Virginia.

History
Reform Temple Shalom of Wheeling WV is the result of the merger of several smaller congregations with Congregation L'Shem Shomayim (Hebrew, meaning "For the sake of Heaven") which was founded in 1849 by Jews who had immigrated from German-speaking Central European nations. It is the oldest Jewish congregation in West Virginia.

Abba Hillel Silver served as its rabbi for two years (1915–1917), immediately after his graduation and ordination at the Hebrew Union College in Cincinnati.

In April 1892 it dedicated an elaborate Moorish Revival synagogue on Eoff Street.   The building, known as the Eoff Street Temple, featured a dome, keyhole door and elaborate keyhole windows. It was used until 1974, when the congregation moved to a new synagogue on Bethany Pike. The Eoff Street synagogue was later demolished.

References

External links
 https://web.archive.org/web/20080730015301/http://www.westvirginiajewishhistory.com/wheeling.htm
 The Wheeling years on the Abba Hillel Silver website http://www.clevelandjewishhistory.net/silver/wheeling1.html

German-American culture in West Virginia
German-Jewish culture in the United States
Moorish Revival architecture in West Virginia
Moorish Revival synagogues
Reform synagogues in the United States
Synagogues in West Virginia
Wheeling, West Virginia